Murray Williams (born 27 June 1982) is a former New Zealand rugby union player. A fly-half, Williams notably played for Bay of Plenty in the National Provincial Championship and the Chiefs in Super Rugby.
 
He played for the New Zealand Colts between 2002 and 2003 and has represented Japan at an international level, where he was a member of their 2011 Rugby World Cup squad.

Williams last played for Mid Canterbury in the Heartland Championship during the 2013 season when they defeated North Otago 26–20 to win the Meads Cup.

References

1982 births
Bay of Plenty rugby union players
Living people
New Zealand rugby union players
Rugby union fly-halves
Japan international rugby union players
New Zealand expatriate rugby union players
Expatriate rugby union players in Japan
New Zealand expatriate sportspeople in Japan
Rugby union players from Auckland
Toyota Industries Shuttles Aichi players
Chiefs (rugby union) players